Fernando González was the defending champion. He defeated José Acasuso in the final 6–1, 6–3.

Seeds

Draw

Finals

Top half

Bottom half

Qualifying

Seeds
All seeds received a bye into the second round.

Qualifiers

Lucky loser
  Sebastián Decoud

Qualifying draw

First qualifier

Second qualifier

Third qualifier

Fourth qualifier

External links
Main draw
Qualifying draw

Singles